Vancea may refer to:

Ioan Vancea (1820–1892), Austro-Hungarian Greek-Catholic bishop
Robert Vancea (born 1976), Romanian footballer
Vancea River, river in Romania
Vancea de Jos River, river in Romania
Vancea de Sus River, river in Romania